Alejandro Ortuoste (born March 17, 1931, date of death unknown) was an amateur boxer from the Philippines. He won the gold medal at the 1954 Asian Games in the men's bantamweight (– 54 kg) division. He represented his native country at the 1952 Summer Olympics in Helsinki, Finland, failing to reach the third round.

1952 Olympic results
 Round of 32: bye
 Round of 16: lost to John McNally  (Ireland) on points, 0-3

References

External links
 

1931 births
Year of death missing
Sportspeople from Manila
Bantamweight boxers
Boxers at the 1952 Summer Olympics
Olympic boxers of the Philippines
Asian Games medalists in boxing
Boxers at the 1954 Asian Games
Filipino male boxers
Asian Games gold medalists for the Philippines
Medalists at the 1954 Asian Games